Euxton was a railway station on the North Union Railway in Euxton, Chorley, Lancashire, England. It was opened on 31 October 1838 and closed on 2 September 1895. The line remains open between Preston and Wigan, however nothing remains of the station.

Although closed as part of the Beeching axe in 1969, the station reopened in 1998 and is now known as Euxton Balshaw Lane railway station.

References

 https://www.leylandhistoricalsociety.co.uk/bb-03.html
 http://www.prestonstation.org.uk/docs/Notable%20Stations%20and%20Their%20Traffic%20-%20Preston%20-%20rm05-1926-337.pdf
 https://www.wiganworld.co.uk/album/photo.php?opt=3&id=14781&gallery=..

Disused railway stations in Chorley
Former London and North Western Railway stations
Railway stations in Great Britain opened in 1838
Railway stations in Great Britain closed in 1895